Kamlesh Khatik also known as The Flying Libero is an Indian Volleyball player who is selected to Indian volleyball team which is going to participate in "20th Asian Senior Men's Volleyball Championship" with Qatar team to be held in Doha, Qatar from 30 August to 10 September 2019.

After that, team will participate in "20th Asian Senior Men's Volleyball Championship" with Iran team to be held in Tehran, Iran from 13 September to 21 September 2019.

References 

Living people
Indian men's volleyball players
1989 births
People from Bhilwara
Volleyball players from Rajasthan